A ball bearing motor or ball-race motor consists simply of a small ball- bearing assembly with provision for passing current radially between inner and outer tracks to produce circular motion.

Explanation

A ball bearing motor is an unusual electric motor that consists of two ball-bearing-type bearings, with the inner races mounted on a common conductive shaft, and the outer races connected to a high current, low voltage power supply. An alternative construction fits the outer races inside a metal tube, while the inner races are mounted on a shaft with a non-conductive section (e.g. two sleeves on an insulating rod). This method has the advantage that the tube will act as a flywheel. The motor rarely starts without assistance, having effectively zero static torque, but once rotation begins the motor will accelerate until it reaches a steady speed, the direction of rotation is determined by the initial spin. Although ball bearing motors can reach reasonably high speeds they are very inefficient. Producing significant torque typically requires so much power that the bearings are heated to several hundred degrees.

Theory
In 1965 Electronics and Power magazine published a letter by RH Barker asking for an explanation of how this type of motor worked. At the time various explanations had been offered. S. Marinov suggests that the device produces motion from electricity without magnetism being involved, operating purely by the resistance heating causing an asymmetric thermal expansion of the balls in the bearings as they rotate. The same explanation is given by Watson, Patel and Sedcole for rotating cylinders (instead of balls). However, H. Gruenberg has given a thorough theoretical explanation based on pure electromagnetism (and neglecting the thermal effects completely). 
Also, P. Hatzikonstantinou and P. G. Moyssides claim to have found an excellent agreement between the results from the electromagnetic theory and the experiments measuring the total power and efficiency of the motor.

See also
 Homopolar generator
 Homopolar motor
 Faraday paradox

References

External links
 The Ball-Bearing electric motor
 motor torque calculation

Electric motors
Rolling-element bearings